"In God's Country" is a song by  rock band U2. It is the seventh track from their fifth studio album The Joshua Tree and was released as the album's fourth single in November 1987 in North America only.

Recording and composition

"In God's Country" was a difficult song for the band to record, which they attributed to not being trained musicians, and they do not speak very highly of it. During The Joshua Tree sessions, they knew it was not going be one of their best songs but they needed more uptempo songs. It was developed out of Bono's frustration at trying to get "a bit of rock 'n' roll out of [U2 guitarist] the Edge". Bono tried to inspire the Edge by teasing and playing on his competitive instincts by claiming to be a better guitarist. Of the song, Bono said "[My] lyric was really good, the tune is pretty good, and the hook is pretty average - thanks to the Edge."

"In God's Country" was recorded in the basement of the Edge's house, which producer Daniel Lanois called a "muggy little room where everything sounds dead" and "not a particularly inspiring place". Despite the location, he said the recording worked because of the "spontaneity and lack of pressure", which contributed to a good take, a quality Lanois favours to overplanning the recording setup. In producing the song, he used a collection of channels in the mixing console designated as sound treatments to adjust the tone of the Edge's guitar to give it a "beautiful shimmer", which he thought contributed to the song's mood. Lanois said, "What was a fairly straightforward rock track is now undermined by a mood of unrest", which inspired lead vocalist Bono to change his lyrics to give them more dimension.

Bono has stated that he originally didn't know whether the song was about Ireland or the United States, but eventually dedicated it to the Statue of Liberty. The song characterises the United States as a "desert rose" and a siren whose dress is torn in "ribbons and bows," a depiction both "sad and seductive". The lyric speaks of a lack of political ideas in the West which Bono later contrasted to the revolution in Nicaragua where he had travelled during the recording of The Joshua Tree. Along with "Where the Streets Have No Name," the lyrics and sound of "In God's Country" reference the desert in accordance with the band's wish for The Joshua Tree to have a "cinematic" sense of location.

Played in the key of D, the verses of the studio version alternates between D and A minor chords. The first chorus repeats an Em–G–D chord progression while the second chorus repeats a C–G–D progression.

Release and critical reception
"In God's Country" was released as a single in Canada and the United States in November 1987. The cover art (photographed by Anton Corbijn), sleeve (designed by Steve Averill), and B-sides ("Bullet the Blue Sky" and "Running to Stand Still") were identical to those used for U2's 1988 single "One Tree Hill," released only in New Zealand and Australia. The Canadian release was available on 7", 12" and cassette, while the US release was limited to 7" only.

"In God's Country" reached number 44 on the Billboard Hot 100 and number 48 in the United Kingdom as an import. It was slightly more successful in Canada, peaking at number 25 in 1988. Sales of the single may have been hampered by the fact that its B-sides were two tracks from The Joshua Tree album instead of the usual non-album tracks. An abridged live version of the song recorded on the Joshua Tree Tour appeared on the band's 1988 rockumentary, Rattle and Hum, but did not appear on the accompanying album of the same name.

The single's video appears on Outside It's America, a documentary tracking the band's first few weeks on tour through the American Southwest in 1987. The music video visualized the Irish immigrant experience and the complexities of the American Dream. It was ultimately not released to MTV or other outlets. The video was finally released on the band's YouTube channel on 19 February 2021.

Hot Press editor and long-time U2 supporter, Bill Graham, described the song as "... U2 cruising, a starter and not a main course ..." and referring to the lyrical cliches, he said the song was "... saved by the fact that [Bono] does Bono better than anybody else."  Cash Box called it a "haunting rocker [that] is led by Bono's passionate, stirring: vocal ability."

Track listing

Personnel
 Bono – vocals, acoustic guitar
 The Edge – guitar,  backing vocals
 Adam Clayton – bass
 Larry Mullen Jr. – drums, percussion

Charts

See also
List of covers of U2 songs - In God's Country

References

U2 songs
1987 singles
Island Records singles
Song recordings produced by Brian Eno
Songs written by Bono
Songs written by the Edge
Songs written by Adam Clayton
Songs written by Larry Mullen Jr.
Song recordings produced by Daniel Lanois
Works about immigration to the United States
1986 songs